The Ministry of Investment and Economic Development was an agency of the government of Poland. The ministry was headquartered in Warsaw and was formed from the Ministry of Development in 2018. Jerzy Kwieciński was the first and only Minister of Investment and Economic Development, serving from 9 January 2018 to 15 November 2019. It was succeeded by the Ministry of Funds and Regional Policy.

List of ministers

References 

Government ministries of Poland
2018 establishments in Poland
Ministries established in 2018